Transcription factor E2F3 is a protein that in humans is encoded by the E2F3 gene.

Function 

The protein encoded by this gene is a member of the E2F family of transcription factors. The E2F family plays a crucial role in the control of cell cycle and action of tumor suppressor proteins and is also a target of the transforming proteins of small DNA tumor viruses. The E2F proteins contain several evolutionally conserved domains found in most members of the family. These domains include a DNA binding domain, a dimerization domain which determines interaction with the differentiation regulated transcription factor proteins (DP), a transactivation domain enriched in acidic amino acids, and a tumor suppressor protein association domain which is embedded within the transactivation domain. This protein and another 2 members, E2F1 and E2F2, have an additional cyclin binding domain. This protein binds specifically to retinoblastoma protein pRB in a cell-cycle dependent manner. Alternative gene splicing is found in the mouse homolog, but has not reported in human yet.

Interactions 

E2F3 has been shown to interact with TFE3 and RYBP.

See also 
 E2F

References

Further reading

External links 
 

Transcription factors